Mohamed Gaber may refer to:
 Mido Gaber, Egyptian footballer
 Mohamed Gaber (wrestler), Egyptian wrestler

See also
 Gaber Mohamed, Egyptian weightlifter